Joe Tyler - (Joseph Tyler) born 1 April 1982 in Halifax, West Yorkshire is a Freestyle skier. He has appeared as a Free rider in various ski movies and skied in the first London Freeze Festival at Battersea Power Station's 2008 snow event. He appeared on Turkish media in 2007 skiing in Erzurum, Turkey. He has spent 2009 living in Mayrhofen in March he travelled to Kashmir with photographer Camilla Stoddart for some extreme skiing(see New Zealand AdventureFall magazine issue 154 & Fall Line Skiing magazine November 2009.) He also travelled to Georgia - ERISTOFF originates from the wild and untamed landscape of Georgia originally named Virshan by the Persians meaning the country of the wolf. Eristoff took professional skier Joe Tyler to the Caucasus mountains of Georgia to sample the slopes and the local hospitality. More information can be found on http://www.metacafe.com/watch/3419799/eristoff_vodka_ski_film_joe_tyler/ He is also in the latest 2009 Run Jump Fly production ski movie "Falling Skies" https://web.archive.org/web/20091027042211/http://www.downdays.eu/en/whitepaper/falling-skies-download

Tyler started skiing at the age of three and competed in many junior events winning artificial dry slope races. He used to be a FIS registered ski racer competing all over Europe. He moved to freestyle skiing in 2004 winning  his debut in the British Big Air ski Championships in 2006 and again 2007 in Laax, Switzerland. He currently competes in international freestyle events and appears in ski movies. He is also a freelance journalist writing articles for ski magazines. He has been a stage 1 New Zealand ski instructor since 2001
He attended North Halifax Grammar School 1996-2000

In 2009,  Joe Tyler founded the All Mountain Academy, a Freeski and Performance Coaching Academy,  in partnership with fellow accomplished Skiers and Coaches Joe Harkess and David Kling-Odencrants

Event Results and Exhibitions - (Corporate & public)

Czech Freeskiing Open 2010 - 5th Overall
European Open Finalist 2006 & 2007 - Laax, Switzerland, Finalist
British Championships 2006 & 2007 - Laax, Switzerland March, 1st Overall
London Ride International Big Air - London Olympia, UK October 2005
Instructor’s Half Pipe	Whistler BC, April 2005	3rd Overall
King of the Rail - Whistler BC, December 2004	3rd Overall
Fire & Ice Show - Whistler BC, 05 Season
Moro Slopestyle - Remarkables, NZ Sept 2004, 4th Overall
Aim Series Big Air - Halifax UK, Aug 2004, 5th Overall
Rosendale Big Air - Rossendale UK, July 2004, 1st Overall
Halifax Air & Style - Halifax UK, May 2004, 1st Overall
Moro Street Jib - Queenstown NZ, Aug 2003, 3rd Overall
Xscape Launch - Xscape Castleford Oct 2003
All England Artificial Dry slope Ski Championships (under 11), 1992 3rd

Other Results & achievements 

NZSIA Fully Certified Ski Instructor, Coronet Peak, New Zealand 2012
NZSIA Telemark Instructor, Cardona Alpine Resort, New Zealand 2012
CSIA Park and Pipe Ceretification Whistler, Canada 2003
NZSIA Level 2 Ski Instructor, Queenstown, New Zealand 2001

Brand Ambassador 

Armada Skis 2008–Present
Adidas Eyewear - 2005–Present
Relentless Energy Drink 2008–Present - https://www.youtube.com/watch?v=p5ybQuhFCG4
Eristoff Vodka 2010 - 2012 - https://www.youtube.com/watch?v=mj7QCXfXrfY
Invicta Watches 2010 - 2012
Dalbello 2010 - 2012
POW Gloves 2008–Present
Bawbags 2008–Present
Salomon 2005 - 2008 - https://www.youtube.com/watch?v=lIbANTbem-E&list=PL591901296BED65B8&index=7&feature=plpp_video
Helly Hansen 2007 - 2009
Orage Clothing 2005 - 2007

External links
Daily Telegraph
London Freeze

Big Air Ski Championships 2006: 
ski news
Ellis-Brigham sponsorship
All Mountain Academy

English male freestyle skiers
Living people
1982 births
Sportspeople from Halifax, West Yorkshire